Ikano Bank is a consumer finance bank established in 1995 by Ingvar Kamprad (the founder of IKEA).

Operations
Ikano Bank has its head office in Malmö, with branch offices in Sundbyberg, Älmhult, Asker, Glostrup, Nottingham, and Helsinki. Ikano Bank also conducts business in Germany, Poland, Austria, Finland, and Russia via separate companies.

Ikano Bank offers loans, savings accounts and partner business supplying sales finance to large retailers, including IKEA, Volkswagen, Audi, Lindex, Hemtex, Skoda, Shell, and Preem.

Ikano Bank is owned by the Kamprad family through IKANO, a group of businesses which also includes insurance, retail, and real estate in many countries.

History
In 1995, Ingvar Kamprad (the founder of IKEA) started Ikanobanken, with one branch office in Älmhult, Sweden.

In January 2009, Ikanobanken became Ikano Bank, merging with other entities within the IKANO Group.

References

Banks of Sweden
Swedish companies established in 1995
Banks established in 1995
Companies based in Malmö